Shouxihu Subdistrict is a subdistrict in Hanjiang District, Yangzhou, Jiangsu, China. , it administers the following four residential communities and two villages: 
Yuanlin Community
Youyi Community
Binhu Community
Wuting Community
Zonghe Village
Baocheng Village

See also 
 List of township-level divisions of Jiangsu

References 

Township-level divisions of Jiangsu
Hanjiang District, Yangzhou